The Blue Butterfly is a 2004 Canadian adventure drama film, directed by Léa Pool, produced by Porchlight Entertainment and Alliance Atlantis, distributed by Monterey Media and starring Marc Donato as Pete Carlton, a boy terminally ill with cancer, whose final wish is to find the elusive blue morpho butterfly. William Hurt plays entomologist Alan Osborne, who takes him to the jungles of Costa Rica to find the insect.

The story is based on the life of David Marenger and his trip with entomologist Georges Brossard in 1987. It was filmed on location in Canada's Montreal, Quebec and Central America's Costa Rica.

Plot
Pete Carlton is a young Montreal boy with terminal cancer. He has a love for butterflies, and often watches entomologist Alan Osborne's television show. His mother, Teresa, meets with Osborne, to try to get him to take her son to Costa Rica to find the rare blue morpho butterfly. However, he dismisses her, but later comes to their home upon receiving a phone call from Pete saying he would go to Central America himself. The two arrive at a small village when they learn the blue morphos have already migrated. Heartbroken, they prepare to leave, until they find one is still in the jungle. They chase after it several times, but are unable to catch it. Pete is determined to find the "magical" butterfly so his cancer can be cured, which leads to them falling into a cavern, injuring Osborne badly. Pete escapes to get help (recalling the earlier words of Mr. Osborne, "You run faster in the jungle without your pants") but it only leads to him being lost, suffering from hallucinations. Osborne is rescued, and as they are leaving to a hospital for Osborne, a friendly villager reveals she has caught the butterfly, giving it to Pete. As he is about to kill it for his collection, he lets it go so it can make more of the magical butterflies. An epilogue shows that at the next visit to the doctor, Pete's cancer had miraculously disappeared.

Cast

References

External links

Official site (Archived at Archive.org)

2004 films
2000s adventure drama films
Canadian drama films
English-language Canadian films
Films directed by Léa Pool
2004 drama films
2000s English-language films
2000s Canadian films